Sir Shanker Sumsher Jung Bahadur Rana was a Nepali diplomat. He served as High Commissioner of Nepal to the Court of St. James and as ambassador to the United States, France and the Netherlands. His father Chandra Shumsher Jung Bahadur Rana was the Prime Minister of Nepal from the Rana dynasty.

Life and career
Born 1909  at Singha Durbar, Kathmandu– 4 June 1976) General (GBE c 16 November 1949, KBE m 24 September 1946), He was son of Bada Maharani Bala Kumari. He was educated at Durbar High Sch. Kathmandu.

In 1927 Rana was appointed Maj-Gen. From 1930 to 1931 he was acting Head Shrestra Kousal. From 1931 to 1934 he was  Head of Madesh Report Nixari and 1947–1949 Kothamahal. From 1936 to 1943 he was  Dir-Gen. PWD. In 1946 he was a member of the special diplomatic mission to confer the Order of Ojaswi Rajanya and the rank of Commanding-General to George VI.

From 1946 to 1947 Rana was Dir-Gen. Roads & Railways Dept. From 1947 to 1949 he was Dir-Gen. Police Dept. In 1948 he was promoted to the rank of General. From 1948 to 1949 he was ADC General & Chief of Staff to the Prime Minister.

From 1949 to 1954 Rana was Ambassador at the Court of St James's with concurrent accreditation to France, the United States and the Netherlands). In 1953 Rana attended the Coronation of Queen Elizabeth II in London 1953.

References

Nepalese diplomats
1909 births
1976 deaths
People from Kathmandu
Children of prime ministers of Nepal
Ambassadors of Nepal to France